Gonçalo alves is a hardwood (from the Portuguese name, Gonçalo Alves). It is sometimes referred to as tigerwood—a name that underscores the wood's often dramatic, contrasting color scheme, that some compare to rosewood.

While the sapwood is very light in color, the heartwood is a sombre brown, with dark streaks that give it a unique look. The wood's color deepens with exposure and age and even the plainer-looking wood has a natural luster.

Two species are usually listed as sources for gonçalo alves: Astronium fraxinifolium and Astronium graveolens, although other species in the genus may yield similar wood; the amount of striping that is present may vary.  All trees grow in neotropical forests; Brazil is a major exporter of these woods.

References

Wood
Plant common names